Rhinocypha ogasawarensis is a species of damselfly in the family Chlorocyphidae. It is endemic to Japan.

References

Insects of Japan
Chlorocyphidae
Insects described in 1913
Taxonomy articles created by Polbot